Sir Jonathan Pryce  (born John Price; 1 June 1947) is a Welsh actor who is known for his performances on stage and in film and television. He has received numerous awards, including two Tony Awards and two Laurence Olivier Awards. In 2021 he was knighted by Queen Elizabeth II for his services to drama. After studying at the Royal Academy of Dramatic Art, he began his career as a stage actor in the early 1970s. His work in theatre includes an Olivier Award-winning performance in the title role of the Royal Court Theatre's Hamlet in 1980 and as The Engineer in the stage musical Miss Saigon in 1990. On the Broadway stage he earned Tony Awards—the first for Best Featured Actor in a Play for his Broadway debut role in Comedians (1977), the second for Best Actor in a Musical for the Broadway transfer of the musical Miss Saigon (1991).

Pryce's theatre work led to several supporting roles in film and television. His breakthrough screen performance was in Terry Gilliam's satirical dystopian black comedy film Brazil (1985). Critically lauded for his versatility, Pryce has appeared in big-budget films including Evita (1996), Tomorrow Never Dies (1997) and Pirates of the Caribbean series (2003–2007), as well as independent films such as the film adaptation of the David Mamet play Glengarry Glen Ross (1992), Martin Scorsese's period drama The Age of Innocence (1993), Christopher Hampton's Carrington (1995), Terrence Malick's historical film The New World (2005) and the drama The Wife (2017) opposite Glenn Close. In 2019, he earned his first Academy Award nomination for his portrayal of Pope Francis in The Two Popes alongside Anthony Hopkins playing Pope Benedict XVI.

For his work on television, he received two Primetime Emmy Award nominations for Outstanding Supporting Actor in a Limited Series or Movie for his performances in Barbarians at the Gate (1993) and Return to Cranford (2010). Pryce has gained acclaim for his roles as Thomas Wolsey in the BBC limited series Wolf Hall (2015), the High Sparrow in the HBO series Game of Thrones (2015–2016) and Sir Stuart Strange in the series Taboo (2017). In 2022, he succeeded Tobias Menzies as Prince Philip in the final two seasons of the award-winning Netflix historical drama series The Crown, gaining a nomination for a Golden Globe Award for Best Supporting Actor.

Early life
Pryce was born John Price on 1 June 1947 in Carmel, Flintshire, the son of Margaret Ellen (née Williams) and Isaac Price, a former coal miner who ran a small general grocery shop with his wife. He has two older sisters and was raised a Welsh Presbyterian. He was educated at Holywell Grammar School and, at the age of 16, went to art college before he started training to be a teacher at Edge Hill College (now Edge Hill University) in Ormskirk, Lancashire. While studying, he took part in a college theatre production. An impressed tutor suggested he should become an actor, and applied to the Royal Academy of Dramatic Art (RADA) for an application form on his behalf. Pryce was subsequently awarded a scholarship to RADA. When he joined Equity, he took "Jonathan Pryce" as his stage name because his birth name was too similar to that of a performer already represented by Equity. While at RADA, he worked as a door-to-door salesman of velvet paintings.

Career

1970s
Despite finding RADA "strait-laced" and being told by his tutor that he could never aspire to do more than playing villains on Z-Cars, Pryce joined the Everyman Theatre in Liverpool upon graduation and eventually became its artistic director. He performed with the Royal Shakespeare Company and the Nottingham Playhouse. To gain his Equity card, he made his first screen appearance in a minor role in "Fire & Brimstone", a 1972 episode of the science fiction drama series Doomwatch. He then starred in two television films directed by Stephen Frears: Daft as a Brush and Playthings. After leaving Everyman, Pryce joined Sir Richard Eyre at the Nottingham Playhouse and starred in Trevor Griffiths' play Comedians, in a role specially written for him. The production moved to the Old Vic Theatre in London. Price reprised the role on Broadway in 1976, this time directed by Mike Nichols, and for which Price won the 1977 Tony Award for Best Featured Actor in a Play. It was around this time that he appeared in his first film role, playing the character Joseph Manasse in the drama Voyage of the Damned, starring Faye Dunaway. He did not, however, abandon the stage, appearing from 1978 to 1979 in the Royal Shakespeare Company's productions of The Taming of the Shrew as Petruchio, and Antony and Cleopatra as Octavius Caesar.

1980s

In 1980, his performance in the title role of Hamlet at the Royal Court Theatre won him an Olivier Award, and was acclaimed by some critics as the definitive Hamlet of his generation. That year, Pryce had a small but pivotal role as Zarniwoop in the 12th episode of the Hitchhiker's Guide to the Galaxy radio series, one that he reprised for the Quintessential Phase which was broadcast in 2005. In his original role as Zarniwoop, Pryce's character questions the "ruler of the Universe", a solipsist who has been chosen to rule arguably because of either his inherent manipulability, or immunity therefrom, on his philosophical opinions. Around the same time, in 1980, he also appeared in the film Breaking Glass. In 1983, Pryce played the role of the sinister Mr. Dark in Something Wicked This Way Comes, based on the Ray Bradbury novel of the same title. After appearing mostly in films, such as the Ian McEwan-scripted The Ploughman's Lunch, and Martin Luther, Heretic (both also 1983), he achieved a breakthrough with his role as the subdued protagonist Sam Lowry in the Terry Gilliam film, Brazil (1985). After Brazil, Pryce appeared in the historical thriller The Doctor and the Devils (also 1985) and then in the Gene Wilder-directed film Haunted Honeymoon (1986). During this period of his life, Pryce continued to perform on stage, and gained particular notice as the successful but self-doubting writer Trigorin in a London production of Anton Chekhov's The Seagull in late 1985. From 1986 to 1987 Pryce played the lead part in the Royal Shakespeare Company's production of Macbeth, which also starred Sinéad Cusack as Lady Macbeth.

Pryce worked once again with Gilliam in The Adventures of Baron Munchausen (1988), playing "The Right Ordinary Horatio Jackson". The film was a notorious financial fiasco, with production costing more than $40 million, when the original budget was $23.5 million. The following year Pryce appeared in three of the earliest episodes of the improvisation show Whose Line Is It Anyway?, alongside Paul Merton and John Sessions, and in Uncle Vanya, again a play by Chekhov, at the Vaudeville Theatre.

1990s
After a series of major dramatic roles on stage, including Vanya and Macbeth, Pryce decided he wanted to do musicals after seeing his friend Patti LuPone in the original London production of Les Misérables. He successfully returned to the stage originating the role of The Engineer, a Eurasian pimp, in the West End musical Miss Saigon. His performance was praised in England where he won the Olivier and Variety Club awards, but when the production transferred to Broadway the Actors' Equity Association (AEA) tried to stop Pryce from portraying The Engineer because, according to their executive secretary, "[t]he casting of a Caucasian actor made up to appear Asian is an affront to the Asian community." The London production featured Pryce in yellowface, wearing prosthetics to alter the shape of his eyes and makeup to alter the color of his skin. The show's producer, Cameron Mackintosh, decided to cancel the $10 million New York production. Realizing that its decision would result in the loss of many jobs, and after Pryce received much support from fellow actors (both Charlton Heston and John Malkovich threatened to leave the union if Pryce was not allowed to perform) the AEA decided to make a deal with Mackintosh, allowing Pryce to appear in the production. He won a Tony Award for his performance in 1991. Made in the same period, Pryce starred in the ITV mini-series Selling Hitler (1991) as Gerd Heidemann. Pryce returned to the London stage the following year to star for one night only at the Royal Festival Hall for an AIDS charity alongside Elaine Paige and Lilliane Montivecchi in the 1992 revival of the Federico Fellini-inspired musical Nine.

Pryce featured, alongside Kathy Burke and Minnie Driver, in the BBC serial Mr. Wroe's Virgins (1993), directed by Danny Boyle. Pryce played Henry Kravis in the HBO produced made-for-TV movie Barbarians at the Gate (1993). He was nominated for a Primetime Emmy Award and for a Golden Globe Award for his role. Also during 1993, Pryce starred alongside River Phoenix and Judy Davis in the unfinished film Dark Blood, but production had to be shut down when, 11 days short of completion, Phoenix died from a drug overdose. Director George Sluizer, who owns the rights to what has been filmed, has made available some of the raw material, which features Pryce and Phoenix on a field in Utah, on his personal website. Between 1993 and 1997, Pryce, on a multimillion-dollar contract became the spokesman for the Infiniti automobile marque in a series of American television commercials, in particular for the Infiniti J30 and Infiniti Q45. In one of these advertisements Pryce appeared alongside jazz singer Nancy Wilson in a Prague nightclub. In 1994, Pryce portrayed Fagin in a revival of the musical Oliver!, and starred alongside Emma Thompson in the film Carrington (1995), which centres on a platonic relationship between gay writer Lytton Strachey and painter Dora Carrington. For his portrayal of Strachey, Pryce received the Best Actor Award at the 1995 Cannes Film Festival.

2000s

During the early 2000s Pryce starred and participated in a variety of movies, such as The Affair of the Necklace (2001), Unconditional Love (2002), What a Girl Wants (2003), and Terry Gilliam's aborted project, The Man Who Killed Don Quixote. While the success of some of these films was variable, the 2001 London stage production of My Fair Lady and his portrayal of Professor Henry Higgins was acclaimed by observers. Martine McCutcheon, who portrayed Eliza Doolittle, was sick during much of the show's run. McCutcheon was replaced by her understudy Alexandra Jay, who would also fall sick hours before a performance, forcing her understudy, Kerry Ellis, to take the lead. On her first night, Pryce introduced Ellis to the audience before the show by saying "This will be your first Eliza, my second today and my third this week. Any member of the audience interested in playing Eliza can find applications at the door. Wednesday and Saturday matinee available." Pryce performed with four Elizas during the course of 14 months. The show was nominated for four Laurence Olivier Awards on 2001: Best Actress in a Musical for Martine McCutcheon, Outstanding Musical Production, Best Theatre Choreographer and Best Actor in a Musical for Pryce. Pryce lost to Philip Quast, and McCutcheon won in her category.

In April 2003 Pryce returned to the non-musical stage with A Reckoning, written by American dramatist Wesley Moore. The play co-starred Flora Montgomery and after premiering at the Soho Theatre in London was described by The Daily Telegraph as "one of the most powerful and provocative new American plays to have opened since David Mamet's Oleanna." Pryce had a role in Pirates of the Caribbean: The Curse of the Black Pearl (2003), in which he portrayed a fictional Governor of Jamaica, Weatherby Swann, a film he has described as "one of those why-not movies." After Pirates, Pryce appeared in several large-scale motion pictures, such as De-Lovely (2004), his second musical film, a chronicle of the life of songwriter Cole Porter, for which Kevin Kline and Pryce covered a Porter song called "Blow, Gabriel, Blow". The Brothers Grimm (2005), Pryce's third completed film with Terry Gilliam, starred Matt Damon and Heath Ledger, and The New World (2005), in which he had a cameo role as King James I. In 2005, Pryce was nominated for another Olivier Award in the best actor category for his role in the 2004 London production of The Goat or Who is Sylvia?, where he played Martin, a goat-lover who has to face the recriminations of his cheated-on wife, played by his real-life wife Kate Fahy. Pryce's performance was highly praised, but he lost the Olivier to Richard Griffiths.

Pryce lent his voice to the French animated film, Renaissance (2006), which he stated he wanted to do because he had never "done anything quite like it before." He reprised the role of Governor Weatherby Swann for the Pirates of the Caribbean sequels, Pirates of the Caribbean: Dead Man's Chest (2006) and Pirates of the Caribbean: At World's End (2007). Both were filmed at the same time but released a year apart. Pryce returned to the Broadway stage replacing John Lithgow, from January to July 2006, as Lawrence Jameson in the musical version of Dirty Rotten Scoundrels. During early 2007, the BBC serial Sherlock Holmes and the Baker Street Irregulars was first broadcast with Pryce in the lead. From September 2007 through June 2008, he returned to the theatre portraying Shelly Levene in a new West End production of David Mamet's Glengarry Glen Ross at the Apollo Theatre, London. Pryce also appeared as part of an ensemble cast in the 2008 real-time strategy video game Command & Conquer: Red Alert 3, playing the role of Marshall Robert Bingham alongside Tim Curry, J.K. Simmons, George Takei and several other veteran actors.

2010s

In 2015, he joined the cast of the HBO series Game of Thrones in Season 5 as the High Sparrow. Pryce admitted that one of the main reasons he took on the role was because of how influential the character is plot-wise. While initially being quite sceptical about "sword and sorcery" shows, Pryce later had a change of heart after his positive experiences on the Thrones sets. In 2015, he also appeared at The Globe Theatre as Shylock in The Merchant of Venice. His real life daughter Phoebe played Shylock's daughter Jessica. In 2015, he joined the cast of The Healer starring with Oliver Jackson-Cohen, Camilla Luddington, and Jorge Garcia.

In 2018, Pryce starred alongside Dame Eileen Atkins in Florian Zeller's play, The Height of the Storm at Wyndham's Theatre in the West End to rapturous reviews. The play was named best play of the year by The Guardian. The play was transferred to Broadway stage where it ran from September to November 2019 at the Samuel J. Friedman Theatre produced by the Manhattan Theatre Club with Pryce and Atkins reprising their performances. The play and the performances received a strong reception from New York critics.

Late that same year, Pryce portrayed Pope Francis, opposite Anthony Hopkins playing Pope Benedict XVI, in the acclaimed Netflix film The Two Popes, directed by Fernando Meirelles, which was released that winter on Netflix. The film and their performances received critical acclaim. He received his first ever Academy Award nomination for Best Actor for the film.

2020s
In August 2020, it was announced that Pryce would portray Prince Philip, Duke of Edinburgh in the final two seasons of Netflix's The Crown. His performance in the fifth season earned him a nomination for the Golden Globe Award for Best Supporting Actor in a Television Series – Comedy/Musical or Drama.

Personal life
While working at the Everyman Theatre in 1972, Pryce met actress Kate Fahy; after a decades-long relationship, they married in 2015. They live in London and have three children: Patrick (born 1983), Gabriel (born 1986), and Phoebe (born 1990). Pryce was raised in the Christian faith, but is no longer religious.

In 2006, Pryce was awarded an honorary doctorate by the University of Liverpool. He is a fellow of the Royal Welsh College of Music & Drama and a Companion of the Liverpool Institute for Performing Arts. He was appointed Commander of the Order of the British Empire (CBE) in the 2009 Birthday Honours.

Pryce was knighted in the 2021 Birthday Honours for services to drama and charity.

Acting credits

Film

Note: The source for Pryce's filmography is taken from the British Film Institute.

Television

Note The source for Pryce's television appearances comes from the British Film Institute.

Theatre 
{| class = "wikitable unsortable"
|-
! Year
! Title
! Role
! Venue
|-
|1976 || Comedians || Gethin Price || Music Box Theatre, Broadway
|-
|1977 || Accidental Death of an Anarchist || The Fool || Belasco Theatre, Broadway
|-
|1978–79 || Measure for Measure || Angelo|| rowspan="2" |Royal Shakespeare Theatre, UK
|-
|1986–87 || Macbeth || Macbeth
|-
|1989–91 || Miss Saigon || The Engineer || Theatre Royal, Drury Lane  Broadway Theatre, Broadway
|-
|1992 || Nine || Guido Contini || Royal Festival Hall, London
|-
|1994–95 || Oliver! || Fagin|| The London Palladium, London
|-
|2004 ||    The Goat or Who Is Sylvia?   || Martin ||  Almeida Theatre, London
|-    
|2005–06 || Dirty Rotten Scoundrels || Lawrence Jameson || Imperial Theatre, Broadway
|-
|2007–08 || Glengarry Glen Ross || Shelley Levene || Apollo Theatre, London
|-
|2009 || Dimetos || Dimetos || Donmar Warehouse, London
|-
|2010 || The Caretaker || Davies || Trafalgar Studios, London 
|-
|2012 || King Lear || Lear|| Almeida Theatre, London
|-
|2016 || The Merchant of Venice || Shylock|| Shakespeare's Globe, UK
|-
|2018–19 || The Height of the Storm || André || Wyndham's Theatre, London  Samuel J. Friedman Theatre, Broadway 
|-
|}

Video games

Awards and honours

References

External links

Jonathan Pryce – Downstage Center interview at American Theatre Wing.org, March 2006
Jonathan Pryce interview on BBC Radio 4 Desert Island Discs'', 25 May 1990

1947 births
20th-century Welsh male actors
21st-century Welsh male actors
Actors awarded knighthoods
Alumni of Edge Hill University
Alumni of RADA
Audiobook narrators
Cannes Film Festival Award for Best Actor winners
Commanders of the Order of the British Empire
Drama Desk Award winners
Knights Bachelor
Laurence Olivier Award winners
Living people
People from Holywell, Flintshire
Royal Shakespeare Company members
Tony Award winners
Welsh male film actors
Welsh male musical theatre actors
Welsh male Shakespearean actors
Welsh male television actors
Welsh male voice actors
Welsh Presbyterians
Welsh-speaking actors